Atmakusumah Astraatmadja (1939) is a recipient of the Ramon Magsaysay Award for his formative role in laying the institutional and professional foundations for a new era of press freedom in Indonesia.

References 

Indonesian journalists
Ramon Magsaysay Award winners
1939 births
Living people